The 1986 World Wrestling Championships were held in Budapest, Hungary.

Medal table

Team ranking

Medal summary

Men's freestyle

Men's Greco-Roman

References
UWW Database

World Wrestling Championships
W
W
International wrestling competitions hosted by Hungary